Brownsville is a former town in Harrison County, in the U.S. state of Ohio.

History
Brownsville was platted in 1815.

References

Geography of Harrison County, Ohio